Choreutis irridens is a species of moth of the family Choreutidae. It is found in Mozambique.

The wingspan is about 10 mm. The forewings are dark fuscous, partially mixed with reddish-brown and slightly sprinkled with whitish, the apical two-fifths of the costa and upper two-thirds of the termen suffused with reddish-brown. There are two indistinct transverse lines of whitish irroration from white dots on the costa, the first at one-third,
straight, the second sinuate-oblique from the costa at three-fifths, abruptly angulated at one-third, then thrice zigzag to the dorsum at two-thirds. The hindwings are dark grey.

References

Endemic fauna of Mozambique
Moths described in 1921
Choreutis
Lepidoptera of Mozambique
Moths of Sub-Saharan Africa